Byron Balasco is an American television producer and screenwriter. He has written and produced for the shows Without a Trace (20062009), FlashForward (2010), and Detroit 1-8-7 (20102011). In 2014, he signed on to executive produce and write for the series he created Kingdom featuring Frank Grillo.

Career
Balasco was the writer and co-producer for several episodes on the television series Huff in 2006. From 2006 to 2009, he worked as supervising producer, co-producer, producer and writer for the series Without a Trace. In 2010, he co-executive produced the series FlashForward, Happy Town and Detroit 1-8-7.

He wrote the pilot for the 2013 series Westside produced by McG. This was Balasco's first series as a creator where he also served as executive producer. The show was never picked up.

In 2014, Balasco signed on as executive producer and writer for the DirectTV series he created titled Kingdom starring Frank Grillo and Jonathan Tucker.

Filmography

As producer

As writer

References

External links
 

Living people
American television producers
American television writers
American male television writers
Year of birth missing (living people)